("purple flame dragon") is a vertical scrolling shooter created by Warashi for the arcade which was released in 1997, later followed by a Sega Saturn console release in 1997 and PlayStation release in 1999 (JP) and 2002 (US).

Story
Taking place in the distant future, Earth's people starts their search for new planets to colonize, specifically those similar to it. The colony ships, known as the Caravans, travel deep into space until Caravan 7861 discovers a suitable fourth planet from an alien sun. However, none of the other Caravans had followed. After 93 years of civilization on the new Mother Planet, the investigation of the missing Caravans finally leads to a horrible discovery: the previous Caravans had been attacked and conquered by a powerful regime of alien-humans. Commanded by the mysterious Shienryu, the alien space fleet invades the Mother Planet and constructs fortresses across the world, destroying and replacing any established human influence. In response, a defense team called "Burn Dragoon" is founded which calls for the best pilots and navigators to defend the new planet from the invading regime.

Game play
Players control either of two double-piloted ships going against the bases of the regime based both on the new mother planet and in space.

Survival is a great emphasis in gameplay as enemies will fire blankets of pulse shots across the screen, some larger than others and some taking on wide intricate patterns.

Extends are awarded to players who reach an indicated score (the score is changeable in the Saturn version) as well as 1Ups, though both 1Ups and even 2Ups are available after defeating minibosses in a certain amount of time.

Weapon System
When player starts a game, the initial fighter fires vulcan with slowest movement.

The selected weapon type determines the type of bomb being used.

Items
Items become available by destroying certain enemies.

Power up (P): Increases fighter's firepower. If the item is collected when weapon power is full, player gets 5000 points. After fighter's firepower is at maximum, up to additional 3 items can be stored, which are added to the next fighter's firepower after current fighter is destroyed.
Speed up (S): Increases fighter's speed (up to 3 times). If the item is collected when fighter is at maximum speed, player gets 5000 points.
Bomb (B): Increases player's bomb stock (up to 20). If the item is collected when bomb stock is full, player gets 5000 points.
Full power & shield (flashing P): Cause fighter to become invulnerable until being hit once, and increases fighter's firepower and speed to maximum. Under the right circumstances, can explode in an array of pick-ups.
Change Vulcan (red): Changes weapon to vulcan.
Change Laser (blue): Changes weapon to laser.
Change Missile (yellow): Changes weapon to missile.
Red LED: Increase player's score by 500 points.
Blue LED: Increase player's score by 5000 points.
1UP: Increases player's life stock by 1.
2UP: Increases player's life stock by 2.

Stages
There are 8 stages in each loop, for a total of 2 loops. In 2nd loop, enemy bullets are fired at faster speeds.

When a player loses a life, the game continues at the last reached pre-defined checkpoint with firepower collected by the last fighter at slowest speed. The checkpoint feature is inactive when a second player is present.

At the end of each stage, player gets 5000 points for each available bomb, 500 points for each red LED collected in the completed stage (blue LED counted as 10 red LEDs).

Bosses
Stage 1: Hell Moa
Stage 2: Giant Owl
Stage 3: Polypus
Stage 4: Dio
Stage 5: Joe
Stage 6: Matoolor
Stage 7: Bisonte
Stage 8: Shienryu

Gekioh Shooting King

It is a PlayStation port of the original Shienryu. It adds following:

Pocket Mode: Presented in PocketStation graphics and effects (under the name JIENRYU), enemies appear as blocky heart-shaped craft and bullets are tiny gray blocks, all lacking graphical detail.
Comical Mode: The same game, only there is no music and the sound effects are replaced by various laugh tracks and an audience applauses the player the higher their score gets.
Stingy Mode: The same game, only the player has only one life, no continues and there are only two levels. Oddly enough, the original soundtrack is used in this mode only.
No Mercy Mode: The same game, only extremely difficult.
Slow Mode: The same game, only darker shading, an atmospheric/techno beat soundtrack and all sound effects are replaced by haunted-house type sounds. It's interesting to note that all enemies and the player's ship scream once destroyed. Despite the greatly slowed movements of all of the sprites onscreen, the game vastly increases the number of bullets put out by the enemy and this mode is, surprisingly, the most difficult setting in the game.
Ancient Mode: The same game, only presented in a yellowed-with-age monochrome screen with cracks and lines in the screen as well as weakened sound effects and music to create an antiquated feel.
Arcade mode now called Gekioh Mode.

Changes to arcade mode
 Gekioh Shooting King has a lower grade version of the original soundtrack resulting in weaker tunes and musical effects.
 Gekioh Shooting King lacks the transparency and depth effects the Saturn original had, particularly on the massive second level boss fight.
Gekioh Shooting King disables save-game abilities particularly high scores and option changes, seeing how there is no option menu in GSK.
The manual to Gekioh Shooting King disavows the original plot and pilot identification.
Gekioh Shooting King does not have a second loop like in the arcade and saturn version. The game will end once the final boss is destroyed.

Shienryu Explosion/Steel Dragon Evolution
It is a sequel that uses 3D graphics.

Fighters
BD-21VM: high speed, low firepower.
BD-22LV: medium speed, medium firepower.
BD-23ML: slow speed, high firepower.

Pilots
There are 6 pilots in the game. Bomb type and weapon colour are changed depending on the pilot.

Passer
Rosa
Cornix
Viola
Laruc
Lilia & Procyon

Weapon system
A fighter can fire strong but concentrated shots, or weak but widespread shots, depending on the button pressed. The fighter's shot strength changes depending on how heavily it is pressed, with 3 pre-defined shot strength settings available in the game. The fighter's moving speed decreases with increasing shot strength, and decreases otherwise.

Stages
There are 8 stages in the game. In addition, there are 2 extra stages that can be unlocked when certain conditions are met. The game's ending is changed depending on pilot.

Multiplier system
When an enemy is destroyed, its score is multiplied between 1 and 256, depending on the frequency the fighter was firing at the time of destruction.

Some enemies drop stars when destroyed by high power shots, and sometimes the enemy bullets are turned into stars. A star's multiplier is between 1 and 256 when the star is collected, but the multiplier value decreases when the fighter fires more heavily. Only when the fighter fires weak or no shots that the star's multiplier is at 256.

Steel Dragon EX

It is a compilation that includes Shienryu (Steel Dragon) and Shienryu Explosion (Steel Dragon Evolution).

Switching between games is achieved by pushing reset button.

Reception
SHUMPS! rated the Shienryu Explosion 7.

Gamerankings rated Steel Dragon EX 36.50% based on 2 reviews.

References

External links

Gekioh Shooting King
HAMSTER page

Steel Dragon EX
D3 Publishing page
Midas page

1997 video games
Arcade video games
PlayStation (console) games
Sega Saturn games
Scrolling shooters
Video games developed in Japan
Hamster Corporation games
Multiplayer and single-player video games